Morungaba is a municipality in the state of São Paulo in Brazil. It is part of the Metropolitan Region of Campinas. The population is 13,781 (2020 est.) in an area of 146.75 km². The elevation is 765 m.

References

Municipalities in São Paulo (state)